The Pasadena Rugby Football Club is a rugby union club based in Pasadena, California. PRFC competes in the Southern California Rugby Football Union's Division I.

History
The club was founded in 1971 by former Japanese national scrum-half Kei Takarabe with the merging of the Warlords and Crown City Rugby Football Clubs which were located in Pasadena, California. For over 30 years, the Club has maintained a strong rugby tradition in the highly competitive SCRFU and has seen several of its players move on to play for the USA Eagles National Team.

Teams

Pasadena RFC consists of a growing Youth (U8, U10, U12, U14), Junior (U16 and U18), Women's (The Royals), second side men's (The Warlords) and first side men's teams. PRFC also fields competitive Rugby Sevens teams over the Summer. In addition to our current teams, PRFC has a vibrant and active Old Boys team, the Owls, that host an Alumni Old Boys game every season.

Successes
Pasadena RFC are a constant fixture in the Southern California Rugby Football Union's Playoffs, having advanced and competed multiple times throughout the club's history.

Sponsorship
Pasadena RFC's primary sponsor is SADA Systems. In addition to SADA Systems, PRFC has individual sponsorship from multiple local and regional businesses.

Charity
The club is a recognized by the IRS as a 501(c)(3) charitable organization. PRFC also actively participates in the Holidays From the Heart Charity sponsored by the Children's Hospital Los Angeles each year.

References

External links
 Official site
 Pasadena Rugby Football Club Facebook
 Southern California Rugby Football Union

Rugby union teams in California
Rugby clubs established in 1971
1971 establishments in California